The Lawson D. Franklin House is a historic mansion in White Pine, Tennessee, United States.

History
The mansion was built in 1835–1840 for Lawson D. Franklin, Tennessee's first millionaire.

Architectural significance
It has been listed on the National Register of Historic Places since April 13, 1973.

References

Houses completed in 1840
Houses in Jefferson County, Tennessee
Houses on the National Register of Historic Places in Tennessee
National Register of Historic Places in Jefferson County, Tennessee